Mara or MARA may refer to:

Animals
Mara (mammal), a species of the cavy family
Mara the Lioness, in the movie Born Free

Arts and entertainment

Fictional characters
Mara (Doctor Who), an evil being in two Doctor Who serials
Mara, a fictional planet of Procyon in the Childe Cycle of Gordon R. Dickson
Mara (She-Ra), fictional characters from the She-Ra and the Princesses of Power and The New Adventures of He-Man animated series
Mara, leader of the Acoma Clan and heroine of the "Empire Trilogy" by Raymond E. Feist and Janny Wurts
Mara Jade, in the Star Wars Expanded Universe
Mara Sewell, a fictional character in The Shield, portrayed by Michele Hicks
Mara Sov, a fictional character in the video game Destiny
Mara Wade, title character of Mara of the Wilderness, a 1965 adventure film
Mara Dyer, title character in the Mara Dyer trilogy by Michelle Hodkin

Other uses in arts and entertainment
Mara (album), a 1995 album by Scottish band Runrig
Mara (film), a 2018 American supernatural horror film starring Olga Kurylenko
Mara, an 1894 novel by Ioan Slavici
Dance Club Mara, a formation dance team, Minsk, Belarus

Cultural and language groupings
Mara (Tagin), a tribe in Arunachal Pradesh
Mara language, a language spoken by the Mara people of India and Burma
Mara people
Maric languages, a group of Aboriginal Australian languages also known as Mara or Maran
Marra language, an Aboriginal Australian language (also known as Mara)
Marra people, an Aboriginal Australian people

Folklore, mythology, and religion
Mara (demon), in Buddhism
Mara (folklore), a wraith-like creature in Germanic and Scandinavian folklore
Mara (Hindu goddess) of death
Mara, anagram of Rama, for Valmiki to chant in Hindu mythology
Marzanna or Mara, Slavic goddess
Māra, Latvian goddess

Military and transport
 MARA (anti-tank weapon), Argentine antitank missile
 Mirage 5P Mara, upgraded Dassault Mirage 5 aircraft for Argentine Air Force
 Shell Mara, a Lake tanker operated in Lake Maracaibo by Shell Oil
 SS Mara, a Lake tanker operated in Lake Maracaibo by Lago Oil and Transport Company

Organisations
Mara (gang), a form of gang in the United States, El Salvador, Honduras and Guatemala
Mara (supermarket), a Romanian supermarket chain
Mara Group, a multinational and multisectoral corporation with roots in East Africa 
Majlis Amanah Rakyat (People's Trust Council), MARA, a Malaysian government agency
Migration Agents Registration Authority, the Australian regulator of migration agents
Universiti Teknologi MARA, a public university in Malaysia

People with the name
Mara (name), list of people with this name
Māra (given name), a Latvian given name
Mára, the stage name for American musician Faith Coloccia during solo performances
Mahinda Rajapaksa, 6th president of Sri Lanka
 Mara (singer), Russian rock singer

Places
Mara (torrent), a stream of Switzerland and Italy
Mara, Aragon, a municipality in the province of Zaragoza, Aragon, Spain
Mara, Iran, a village in Iran
Mara, Isfahan, a village in Iran
Mara, Kerman, a village in Iran
Mara, Sardinia, a commune on the Italian island of Sardinia
Mara, a small town in the Bushveld of South Africa
Mara, a village in Desești Commune, Maramureș County, Romania
Mara, a village in Tararua District, part of Wellington Region, New Zealand
Mara District, a district in the province of Cotabambas, Apurimac, Peru
Mara (Iza), a river in northern Romania
Mara Mountain, a mountain in Greenland, and the closest mountain to the North Pole
Mara Provincial Park (Ontario), a provincial park located near Orillia, Ontario, Canada
Mara Provincial Park, a provincial park in British Columbia, Canada
Mara Region, an administrative division in Tanzania
Mara River (Nunavut), a river in Canada
Mara River, a river of Kenya and Tanzania
Măra River, a river in Romania
Marado or Mara Island, South Korea
Masai Mara, known locally as "The Mara", a reserve in Kenya near the Mara River

Other uses
MaraDNS, DNS software

See also
Mahra (disambiguation)
Marah (disambiguation)
Maras (disambiguation)
Marra (disambiguation)
Mara language

Language and nationality disambiguation pages